John Charles Reynolds (June 1, 1935 – April 28, 2013) was an American computer scientist.

Education and affiliations
John Reynolds studied at Purdue University and then earned a Doctor of Philosophy (Ph.D.) in theoretical physics from Harvard University in 1961. He was a professor of information science at Syracuse University from 1970 to 1986. From then until his death he was a professor of computer science at Carnegie Mellon University. He also held visiting positions at Aarhus University (Denmark), University of Edinburgh, Imperial College London, Microsoft Research (Cambridge, UK) and Queen Mary University of London.

Academic work
Reynolds's main research interest was in the area of programming language design and associated specification languages, especially concerning formal semantics. He invented the polymorphic lambda calculus (System F) and formulated the property of semantic parametricity; the same calculus was independently discovered by Jean-Yves Girard. He wrote a seminal paper on definitional interpreters, which clarified early work on continuations and introduced the technique of defunctionalization. He applied category theory to programming language semantics. He defined the programming languages Gedanken and Forsythe, known for its use of intersection types. He worked on a separation logic to describe and reason about shared mutable data structures.

Reynolds created an elegant, idealized formulation of the programming language ALGOL, which exhibits ALGOL's syntactic and semantic purity, and is used in programming language research. It also made a convincing methodologic argument regarding the suitability of local effects in the context of call-by-name languages, in contrast with the global effects used by call-by-value languages such as ML. The conceptual integrity of the language made it one of the main objects of semantic research, along with Programming Computable Functions (PCF) and ML.

He was an editor of journals such as the Communications of the ACM and the Journal of the ACM. In 2001, he was appointed a Fellow of the Association for Computing Machinery (ACM). He won the ACM SIGPLAN Programming Language Achievement Award in 2003, and the Lovelace Medal from the British Computer Society in 2010.

Selected publications
Books
 The Craft of Programming, Prentice Hall International, 1981. .
 Theories of Programming Languages, Cambridge University Press, 1998. .
Articles

References

Further reading
 Olivier Danvy, Peter O'Hearn and Philip Wadler (editors), "Festschrift for John C. Reynolds's 70th Birthday". Theoretical Computer Science, 375(1–3):1–350,  1 May 2007. Editorial, pages 1–2. 
  Stephen Brookes, Peter O'Hearn and Uday Reddy, "The Essence of Reynolds".  POPL 2014, pages 251–256.

External links 
 
 Curriculum Vitae
 
 
 Program Verification and Semantics: Further Work (London, 2004)

1935 births
2013 deaths
Harvard University alumni
Purdue University alumni
American computer scientists
Formal methods people
Programming language researchers
Academics of Imperial College London
Academics of Queen Mary University of London
Academics of the University of Edinburgh
Syracuse University faculty
Carnegie Mellon University faculty
Academic journal editors
Microsoft employees
Fellows of the Association for Computing Machinery